Cassin's spinetail (Neafrapus cassini) is a species of swift in the family Apodidae.
It is found throughout the African tropical rainforest (including Bioko).

References

Cassin's spinetail
Birds of the Gulf of Guinea
Birds of the African tropical rainforest
Cassin's spinetail
Cassin's spinetail
Taxonomy articles created by Polbot